Lakeville Lake is an all-sports,  Oakland County, Michigan lake located in the northeast part of the county in Addison Township.

The all-sports lake has a public boat launch.

Fish

Lakeville Lake fish include panfish, bass, northern pike and walleye.

References

Lakes of Oakland County, Michigan
Lakes of Michigan